In Greek mythology, Meta (Ancient Greek: Μήταν "beyond") was the daughter of Hoples who became the first wife of Aegeus, king of Athens. She bore no child to the king thus he married another woman named Chalciope, daughter of Rhexenor or Chalcodon, who also could not give him an heir to the throne. Eventually, the hero Theseus became Aegeus' first born by Aethra after the Athenian ruler was made drunk by Pittheus, the maiden's daughter. In other traditions Meta was called Mellite.

Notes

References 

 Apollodorus, The Library with an English Translation by Sir James George Frazer, F.B.A., F.R.S. in 2 Volumes, Cambridge, MA, Harvard University Press; London, William Heinemann Ltd. 1921. ISBN 0-674-99135-4. Online version at the Perseus Digital Library. Greek text available from the same website.
 Athenaeus of Naucratis, The Deipnosophists or Banquet of the Learned. London. Henry G. Bohn, York Street, Covent Garden. 1854. Online version at the Perseus Digital Library.
 Athenaeus of Naucratis, Deipnosophistae. Kaibel. In Aedibus B.G. Teubneri. Lipsiae. 1887. Greek text available at the Perseus Digital Library.
 William Smith. A Dictionary of Greek and Roman biography and mythology. s.v. Meta. London (1848). 

Women in Greek mythology
Attican characters in Greek mythology